Linonia is a literary and debating society founded in 1753 at Yale University. It is the university's second-oldest secret society.

History

Linonia was founded on September 12, 1753, as Yale College's second literary and debating society, after Crotonia, founded in 1738.  

By the late eighteenth century, all incoming freshmen became members either of Linonia or its rival society, Brothers in Unity, which was founded in 1768. Other debating societies arose throughout the eighteenth and early nineteenth century, notably Calliope in 1819, but were relatively short-lived.  

By the end of the Civil War, the social dominance of Linonia and Brothers began to decline. Both folded in the 1870s. The debating society system ultimately evolved into the Yale Union and later in 1934, the Yale Political Union.  

Linonia was reconstituted multiple times throughout the 20th century, with its current form taking the shape of Yale's other undergraduate secret societies. 

Each year's delegation of twenty is drawn from students in the senior undergraduate class, Yale Law School, Yale Graduate School, and Yale School of Management. Linonia is the only Yale secret society known to tap students beyond the undergraduates. Each delegate is selected by unanimous vote among Linonia alumni and delegates.  

Linonia participates in Yale's tap night during the second week of April. Unlike many secret societies whose focus is the members' biographies, Linonia meetings often involve debate on intellectual and political topics.

Linonia and Sterling Memorial Library
In 1871, Linonia and Brothers donated their literary collections to the university's new central library, then shut down. Both societies had kept substantial collections of works not deemed suitable by the Yale faculty, which did not teach English literature until the late nineteenth century. The donation is commemorated in the Linonia and Brothers Reading Room at Yale's Sterling Memorial Library. The reading room contains the Linonia and Brothers (L&B) collection, a travel collection, a collection devoted to medieval history, and a selection of new books recently added to Sterling’s collections. The library is undergoing renovation to be completed in 2023. 

The Linonian Society, Brothers in Unity, and Calliope are commemorated with courtyards in Branford College.

Prominent members

Timothy Dwight IV - Class of 1767  - An American academic and educator, a Congregationalist minister, theologian, and author. He was the eighth president of Yale College (1795–1817)
Abraham Baldwin - Class of 1772 - An American politician, Patriot, and Founding Father from the U.S. state of Georgia. Baldwin was a Georgia representative in the Continental Congress and served in the United States House of Representatives and Senate after the adoption of the Constitution. Baldwin was the founding father of the University of Georgia, first state-charted public institution of higher education in the United States and served as its first president.
Nathan Hale - Class of 1773 - Spy for General George Washington and the state hero of Connecticut
James Hillhouse - Class of 1773 - An American lawyer, real estate developer, and politician from New Haven, Connecticut. He represented Connecticut in both the U.S. House and Senate
Eli Whitney - Class of 1789 - An American inventor best known for inventing the cotton gin
Jeremiah Day - Class of 1789 - An American academic, a Congregational minister and President of Yale College (1817–1846).
James Fenimore Cooper - Class of 1806 - A prolific and popular American writer of the early 19th century, author of Last of the Mohicans
Henry Leavitt Ellsworth - Class of 1810 - A Yale-educated attorney who became the first Commissioner of the U.S. Patent Office, where he encouraged innovation by inventors Samuel F.B. Morse and Samuel Colt. Ellsworth also served as the second president of the Aetna Insurance Company, and was a major donor to Yale College, a commissioner to Indian tribes on the western frontier, and the founder of what became the United States Department of Agriculture.
Roger Sherman Baldwin- Class of 1811 - An American lawyer involved in the Amistad case, who later became the 32nd Governor of Connecticut and a United States Senator.
Asa Thurston - Class of 1818 - First American Christian Missionary to the Hawaiian Islands.
Nathaniel Parker Willis - Class of 1827 - An American author, poet and editor who worked with several notable American writers including Edgar Allan Poe and Henry Wadsworth Longfellow. He became the highest-paid magazine writer of his day
Frederick Augustus Porter Barnard - Class of 1828 -  A classical and English scholar, a mathematician, a physicist, a chemist, and a good public speaker.  He was the tenth president of Columbia University in New York City. Barnard strove to have educational privileges extended by the university to women as well as to men, and Barnard College
Noah Porter - Class of 1831 - An American academic, philosopher, author, lexicographer and President of Yale College (1871–1886).
Ebenezer Kingsbury Hunt - Class of 1833 - a prominent physician in Hartford, Connecticut. The E. K. Hunt Chair (i.e., Professorship) of Anatomy at Yale University is named after Ebenezer Kingsbury Hunt.
William M. Evarts - Class of 1837 - An American lawyer and statesman who served as U.S. Secretary of State, U.S. Attorney General and U.S. Senator from New York.
Josiah Whitney - Class of 1839 - An American geologist, professor of geology at Harvard University, and chief of the California Geological Survey. Mount Whitney, the highest point in the continental United States, and the Whitney Glacier, the first confirmed glacier in the United States were both named after him by members of the Survey.
Joseph Gibson Hoyt - Class of 1840 - was the first chancellor and a professor of Greek at Washington University in St. Louis (then named Washington Institute in St. Louis) from 1858-1862.
Andrew Dickson White - Class of 1853 - A U.S. diplomat, historian, and educator, who was the co-founder of Cornell University.
Timothy Dwight V - Class of 1849 - An American academic, an educator, a Congregational minister, and president of Yale College (1886–1898).[1] During his years as head of the institution, Yale developed as a university.
Daniel Coit Gilman - Class of 1852 - Founder of the Sheffield Scientific School at Yale College, and who subsequently served as one of the earliest presidents of the University of California, the first president of Johns Hopkins University, and as founding president of the Carnegie Institution. He was also co-founder of the Russell Trust Association, which administers the business affairs of Yale's Skull and Bones society.
Chauncey Mitchell Depew - Class of 1856 - The attorney for Cornelius Vanderbilt's railroad interests, president of the New York Central Railroad System, and a United States Senator from New York from 1899 to 1911.
Francis Miles Finch - Class of 1859 - An American judge, poet, and academic associated with the early years of Cornell University. One of his poems, "The Blue and the Gray", is frequently reprinted to this day.
Elisha Jay Edwards - Class of 1870 - (often bylined as E.J. Edwards, and under the pen name Holland) was a well-known investigative journalist and financial reporter of the late 19th and early 20th century. He broke the story in 1893 of President Grover Cleveland's secret cancer surgery, which the administration denied. Edwards graduated from Yale University in 1870, and its law school in 1873. He served as Washington correspondent of the New York Sun from 1880–84, and editor of the New York Evening Sun from 1887-89.
Walter Camp - Class of 1875 - An American football player, coach, and sports writer known as the "Father of American Football"
Dick Celeste - Class of 1959 - 64th Governor of Ohio, Ambassador to India, and 12th President of Colorado College
Les Aspin - Class of 1960 - 18th Secretary of Defense under Bill Clinton and representative for Wisconsin's 1st Congressional District

References

See also
Collegiate secret societies in North America

Organizations established in 1753
Secret societies at Yale
Student debating societies
Yale University Library
College literary societies in the United States
Student organizations established in the 18th century